The Leas Lift is a grade II* listed funicular railway that carries passengers between the seafront and the promenade in Folkestone, Kent. Originally installed in 1885, it is one of the oldest water lifts in the UK. 

The lift operates using water and gravity and is controlled from a small cabin at the top of the cliff. It has carried more than 36.4 million people since it opened, in a process that is especially energy efficient. The lift has a very small carbon footprint, as it emits no pollution and recycles all of the water used to drive the cars.

On June 1991, the lift was seen in an episode of The Darling Buds of May.

In June 2009, Folkestone and Hythe District Council’s lease ran out and it was decided that the lift was too expensive to run. Campaigners subsequently protested against the closure of the lift and in April 2010, it was announced that the lift was to be restored.

Restoration works

Crofton Consulting was appointed as lead consultant to provide structural engineering design for the restoration. Crofton won the Building Structures award at the ACE Engineering Excellence Awards in May 2011 and won the Restoration award at the ICE Engineering Excellence Awards in June 2011 for its work on the lift. G A Harpers was appointed as the main contractor to carry out the necessary construction work.

The renovation involved replacing the mechanical and electrical wiring and ensuring that all necessary safety standards in the two cars, the control systems and stations, were met. There was also a focus on restoring the associated power pumps that control the lift at the top and bottom stations.

The wheel bearings on the lift cars were all found to be damaged by corrosion so the wheels were re-machined to provide the correct running profile. Additionally, the corroded steelwork support structures within the buried water storage tanks, which were leaking, were inspected and replaced.

The operation of the Folkestone lift was then taken over by The Folkestone Leas Lift Community Interest Company on behalf of the community as a non-profit-making organisation. It opened the attraction as a living museum.

In January 2017, the lift again closed temporarily following an HSE inspection which determined that a secondary fail-safe braking system must be installed before the lift could be re-opened. £80,000 was raised to conduct the preliminary works required to reinstate the lift, including a full engineering survey. A new company, the Folkestone Leas Lift Company (FLLC) was set up and with funding from the Radnor Estate and the Roger De Haan Charitable Trust. The FLLC's aim is to raise funds to help repair the lift, and to create and implement a sustainable long-term plan for its operation.

See also 
 List of funicular railways

References

External links
 Leas Lift, a water and gravity powered funicular railway in Folkestone
The CIC website www.leaslift.co.uk

Funicular railways in the United Kingdom
Folkestone
Water-powered funicular railways